Labeobarbus is a mid-sized ray-finned fish genus in the family Cyprinidae. Its species are widely distributed throughout eastern Africa and especially southern Africa, but also in Lake Tana in Ethiopia. A common name, in particular for the southern species, is yellowfish. The scientific name refers to the fact that these large barbs remind of the fairly closely related "carps" in the genus Labeo in size and shape. As far as can be told, all Labeobarbus species are hexaploid.

Systematics 
Like many other "barbs", it was long included in Barbus. It appears to be a fairly close relative of the typical barbels and relatives – the genus Barbus proper –, but closer still to the large Near Eastern species nowadays separated in Carasobarbus. Barbus has been split to account for the improved phylogenetic knowledge which indicated it was highly paraphyletic in its wide circumscription –, it may be that Carasobarbus and some other closely related "barbs" (e.g. Labeobarbus reinii) are now included in Labeobarbus to avoid a profusion of very small genera.

The taxonomy of many species in the "wastebin genus" Barbus has recently been re-evaluated. Though hybrid introgression may confound studies based in mtDNA data alone, a number of these species appear to be so closely related to Labeobarbus to warrant inclusion in the present genus outright, irrespective if Carasobarbus is considered distinct or not. These include L. ethiopicus.

Species
Labeobarbus at present contains the following species:
 Labeobarbus acuticeps (Matthes, 1959)
 Labeobarbus acutirostris (Bini, 1940)
 Labeobarbus aeneus (Burchell, 1822) (Smallmouth yellowfish)
 Labeobarbus alluaudi Pellegrin, 1909
 Labeobarbus altianalis Boulenger, 1900 (Ripon barbel)
 Labeobarbus altipinnis Banister & Poll, 1973
 Labeobarbus ansorgii Boulenger, 1906
 Labeobarbus aspius (Boulenger, 1912)
 Labeobarbus axelrodi (Getahun, Stiassny & Teugels, 2004)
 Labeobarbus batesii (Boulenger, 1903)
 Labeobarbus beso (Rüppell, 1835)
 Labeobarbus boulengeri (Vreven, Musschoot, Snoeks & Schliewen, 2016)
 Labeobarbus brauni (Pellegrin, 1935)
 Labeobarbus brevicephalus (Nagelkerke & Sibbing, 1997)
 Labeobarbus brevispinis (Holly, 1927)
 Labeobarbus bynni (Forsskål, 1775)
 Labeobarbus cardozoi (Boulenger, 1912)
 Labeobarbus caudovittatus (Boulenger, 1902)
 Labeobarbus clarkeae (Banister, 1984)
 Labeobarbus claudinae De Vos & Thys van den Audenaerde, 1990
 Labeobarbus codringtonii (Boulenger, 1908) (Upper Zambezi yellowfish)
 Labeobarbus compiniei (Sauvage, 1879)
 Labeobarbus crassibarbis (Nagelkerke & Sibbing, 1997)
 Labeobarbus dainellii (Bini, 1940)
 Labeobarbus dartevellei Poll, 1945
 Labeobarbus dimidiatus Tweddle & P. H. Skelton, 1998
 Labeobarbus ensifer Boulenger, 1910
 Labeobarbus ethiopicus Zolezzi, 1939
 Labeobarbus fasolt Pappenheim, 1914
 Labeobarbus fimbriatus Holly, 1926
 Labeobarbus gananensis Vinciguerra, 1895
 Labeobarbus gestetneri Banister & R. G. Bailey, 1979
 Labeobarbus girardi Boulenger, 1910
 Labeobarbus gorgorensis (Bini, 1940)
 Labeobarbus gorguari (Rüppell, 1835)
 Labeobarbus gruveli Pellegrin, 1911
 Labeobarbus gulielmi Boulenger, 1910
 Labeobarbus habereri (Steindachner, 1912)
 Labeobarbus huloti Banister, 1976
 Labeobarbus humphri Banister, 1976
 Labeobarbus intermedius (Rüppell, 1835)
 Labeobarbus iphthimostoma Banister & Poll, 1973
 Labeobarbus iturii Holly, 1929
 Labeobarbus jaegeri Holly, 1930 
 Labeobarbus johnstonii (Boulenger, 1907)
 Labeobarbus jubae Banister, 1984
 Labeobarbus jubbi Poll, 1967
 Labeobarbus kimberleyensis (Gilchrist & W. W. Thompson, 1913) (Largemouth yellowfish)
 Labeobarbus lagensis (Günther, 1868)
 Labeobarbus latirostris (Keilhack, 1908)
 Labeobarbus leleupanus Matthes, 1959\
 Labeobarbus lobogenysoides  Pellegrin, 1935
 Labeobarbus longidorsalis Pellegrin, 1935
 Labeobarbus longifilis Pellegrin, 1935
 Labeobarbus longissimus (Nagelkerke & Sibbing, 1997)
 Labeobarbus lucius (Boulenger, 1910)
 Labeobarbus lufupensis Banister & R. G. Bailey, 1979
 Labeobarbus macroceps Fowler, 1936
 Labeobarbus macrolepidotus Pellegrin, 1928
 Labeobarbus macrolepis Pfeffer, 1889
 Labeobarbus macrophtalmus (Bini, 1940)
 Labeobarbus malacanthus (Pappenheim, 1911)
 Labeobarbus marequensis (A. Smith, 1841) (Largescale yellowfish)
 Labeobarbus mariae Holly, 1926 
 Labeobarbus matris Holly, 1928
 Labeobarbus mawambiensis Steindachner, 1911
 Labeobarbus mbami (Holly, 1927)
 Labeobarbus megastoma (Nagelkerke & Sibbing, 1997)
 †Labeobarbus microbarbis L. R. David & Poll, 1937 (declared extinct in 2006)
 Labeobarbus micronema (Boulenger, 1904)
 Labeobarbus microterolepis Boulenger, 1902
 Labeobarbus mirabilis Pappenheim, 1914
 Labeobarbus mungoensis (Trewavas, 1974)
 Labeobarbus nanningsi (de Beaufort, 1933)
 Labeobarbus natalensis (Castelnau, 1861) (Scaly yellowfish)
 Labeobarbus nedgia Rüppell, 1835
 Labeobarbus nelspruitensis Gilchrist & W. W. Thompson, 1911 (Incomati chiselmouth)
 Labeobarbus nthuwa Tweddle & P. H. Skelton, 2008
 Labeobarbus osseensis (Nagelkerke & Sibbing, 2000)
 Labeobarbus oxyrhynchus Pfeffer, 1889 (Pangani barb)
 Labeobarbus pagenstecheri J. G. Fischer, 1884
 Labeobarbus parawaldroni Lévêque, Thys van den Audenaerde & Traoré, 1987
 Labeobarbus pellegrini Bertin & Estève, 1948
 Labeobarbus petitjeani Daget, 1962
 Labeobarbus platydorsus (Nagelkerke & Sibbing, 1997)
 Labeobarbus platyrhinus Boulenger, 1900
 Labeobarbus platystomus Pappenheim, 1914 (Rwandese carp)
 Labeobarbus pojeri (Poll, 1944)
 Labeobarbus polylepis (Boulenger, 1907) (Smallscale yellowfish)
 Labeobarbus progenys (Boulenger, 1903)
 Labeobarbus pungweensis R. A. Jubb, 1959 (Pungwe chiselmouth)
 †Labeobarbus reinii Günther, 1874 (Giant Atlas barbel) (declared extinct in 2022)
 Labeobarbus rhinoceros (Copley, 1938) (Rhinofish)
 Labeobarbus rhinophorus Boulenger, 1910
 Labeobarbus robertsi Banister, 1984
 Labeobarbus rocadasi (Boulenger, 1910)
 Labeobarbus rosae (Boulenger, 1910)
 Labeobarbus roylii (Boulenger, 1912)
 Labeobarbus ruandae Pappenheim, 1914
 Labeobarbus ruasae Pappenheim, 1914
 Labeobarbus ruwenzorii (Pellegrin, 1909)
 Labeobarbus sacratus Daget, 1963
 Labeobarbus sandersi Boulenger, 1912
 Labeobarbus seeberi (Gilchrist & Thompson, 1913) (Clanwilliam yellowfish)
 Labeobarbus semireticulatus Pellegrin, 1924
 Labeobarbus somereni Boulenger, 1911
 Labeobarbus stappersii Boulenger, 1915
 Labeobarbus steindachneri Boulenger, 1910
 Labeobarbus stenostoma Boulenger, 1910
 Labeobarbus surkis (Rüppell, 1835)
 Labeobarbus tornieri Steindachner, 1906
 Labeobarbus trachypterus Boulenger, 1915
 Labeobarbus tropidolepis Boulenger, 1900
 Labeobarbus truttiformis (Nagelkerke & Sibbing, 1997)
 Labeobarbus tsanensis (Nagelkerke & Sibbing, 1997)
 Labeobarbus upembensis Banister & R. G. Bailey, 1979
 Labeobarbus urotaenia Boulenger, 1913
 Labeobarbus varicostoma Boulenger, 1910
 Labeobarbus versluysii (Holly, 1929)
 Labeobarbus werneri Holly, 1929
 Labeobarbus wittei Banister & Poll, 1973
 Labeobarbus wurtzi Pellegrin, 1908
 Labeobarbus xyrocheilus Tweddle & P. H. Skelton, 1998

Footnotes

References
 
  (2007): Evolutionary origin of Lake Tana's (Ethiopia) small Barbus species: indications of rapid ecological divergence and speciation. Anim. Biol. 57(1): 39-48.  (HTML abstract)
  (2009): 2009 IUCN Red List of Threatened Species. Version 2009.1. Retrieved 2009-SEP-20.

 
Taxa named by Eduard Rüppell
Cyprinidae genera